Austin Mahone is an American singer and songwriter. He has won nine awards, including Artist to Watch at the 2013 MTV Video Music Awards.

Bravo Otto

iHeartRadio Music Awards

Kids' Choice Awards

Argentina Kids' Choice Awards

Meus Prêmios Nick

Mexico Kids' Choice Awards

UK Kids' Choice Awards

MTV Awards

MTV Video Music Awards

MTV Europe Music Awards

Neox Fan Awards

People's Choice Awards

Premios Juventud

Radio Disney Music Awards

Teen Choice Awards

Young Hollywood Awards

References

Mahone, Austin